Bakersfield is a city in Kern County, California, United States. It is the county seat and largest city of Kern County. The city covers about  near the southern end of the San Joaquin Valley and the Central Valley region. Bakersfield's population as of the 2020 census was 403,455, making it the 48th most populous city in the United States of America and the 9th most populous city in California. The Bakersfield–Delano Metropolitan Statistical Area, which includes all of Kern County, had a 2020 census population of 909,235, making it the 62nd largest metropolitan area in the United States. The urban area that includes Bakersfield and areas immediately around the city, such as East Bakersfield, Oildale, and Rosedale, has a population of 570,235.

Bakersfield is a significant hub for both agriculture and energy production. Kern County is the most productive oil-producing county in California and the fourth most productive agricultural county (by value) in the United States. Industries in and around Bakersfield include natural gas and other energy extraction, mining, petroleum refining, distribution, food processing, and corporate regional offices. The city is the birthplace of the country music genre known as the Bakersfield sound.

History 

Archaeological evidence indicates the presence of Native American settlements dating back thousands of years. Upon Spanish arrival, present-day Bakersfield was inhabited by the Yowlumne, a Yokuts people. Yowlumne accounts indicate that the village of Woilu was situated in the bounds of the present city.

The Yokuts of the region lived in lodges along the branches of the Kern River delta and hunted antelope, tule elk, deer, bear, fish, and game birds.

In 1776, Spanish missionary Francisco Garcés became the first European to explore the area. Recording his May 1 arrival to a Yokuts village along the Kern River, immediately northeast of present-Bakersfield, Garcés wrote,

Given the remoteness and inaccessibility of the region, the Yokuts remained largely isolated from further contact until after the Mexican War of Independence, when Mexican settlers began to migrate to the area. Following the discovery of gold in California in 1848, settlers flooded into the San Joaquin Valley. In 1851, gold was discovered along the Kern River in the southern Sierra Nevada, and in 1865, oil was discovered in the valley. The Bakersfield area, once a tule reed-covered marshland, was first known as Kern Island to the handful of pioneers, who built log cabins there in 1860. The area was subject to periodic flooding from the Kern River, which occupied what is now the downtown area, and experienced outbreaks of malaria.

Bakersfield is the fifth-largest majority-Hispanic city in the United States, with 53% of its population being Hispanic in 2020.

Founding 

In 1861, disastrous floods swept away the original settlement founded in 1860 by the German-born Christian Bohna.  Among those attracted to the area by the California gold rush was Thomas Baker, a lawyer and former colonel in the militia of Ohio, his home state. Baker moved to the banks of the Kern River in 1863, at what became known as Baker's Field, which became a stopover for travelers.  By 1870, with a population of 600, what is now known as Bakersfield was becoming the principal town in Kern County.

In 1873, Bakersfield was officially incorporated as a city, and by 1874, it officially replaced the town of Havilah as the county seat.  Alexander Mills was hired as the city marshal, a man one historian would describe as "... an old man by the time he became Marshal of Bakersfield, and he walked with a cane. But he was a Kentuckian, a handy man with a gun, and not lacking in initiative and resource when the mood moved him." Businessmen and others began to resent Mills, who was cantankerous and high-handed in his treatment of them. Wanting to fire him but fearing reprisals, they came up with a scheme to disincorporate, effectively leaving him without an employer. According to local historian Gilbert Gia the city was also failing to collect the taxes it needed for services. In 1876, the city voted to disincorporate. For the next 22 years, a citizen's council managed the community.

By 1880, Bakersfield had a population of 801 with 250 of Chinese descent.

By 1890, it had a population of 2,626. Migration from Texas, Louisiana, Oklahoma, and Southern California brought new residents, who were mostly employed by the oil industry.

The city reincorporated on January 11, 1898.

1952 earthquake 

On July 21, 1952, an earthquake struck at 4:52 am Pacific Daylight Time. The earthquake, which measured 7.5 on the moment magnitude scale and was felt from San Francisco to the Mexican border, destroyed the nearby communities of Tehachapi and Arvin. The earthquake's destructive force bent cotton fields into U shapes, slid a shoulder of the Tehachapi Mountains across all four lanes of the Ridge Route, collapsed a water tower creating a flash flood, and destroyed the railroad tunnels in the mountain chain. Bakersfield was somewhat spared, experiencing minor architectural damage without loss of life.

A large aftershock occurred on July 29, and did minor architectural damage, but raised fears that the flow of the Friant-Kern Canal could be dangerously altered, potentially flooding the city and surrounding areas.

Aftershocks continued for the next month, and on August 22 at 3:42 pm, another earthquake, measured at 5.8, struck directly under the city's center in the most densely populated area of the southern San Joaquin Valley. Four people died in the aftershock, and many of the town's historic structures sustained heavy damage.

1970 to 2010 
Between 1970 and 2010, Bakersfield grew 400% (from 70,000 to 347,483), making it one of the fastest-growing cities in California.

Bakersfield's close proximity to mountain passes, primarily the Tejon Pass on Interstate 5 between the Greater Los Angeles Area and the San Joaquin Valley, has made the city a regional transportation hub.

In 1990, Bakersfield was one of 10 U.S. communities to receive the All-America City Award from the National Civic League.

In 2010, the Bakersfield MSA had a gross metropolitan product of $29.466 billion, making it the 73rd-largest metropolitan economy in the United States.

Historic architecture and preservation 

Bakersfield has a number of buildings and locations that have been designated as historic sites at the national, state, and city levels.  Five buildings have been listed on the National Register of Historic Places (NRHP), including the First Baptist Church (NRHP 1/2/79); Baker Street Library (NRHP 4/1/81) and Bakersfield Californian Building (NRHP 3/10/83). Four sites have been designated as California Historical Landmarks, including Garces Memorial Circle (designated in 1937) and the Colonel Thomas Baker Memorial (designated in 1944). In addition, 16 sites have been locally designated on the Bakersfield Register of Historic Places, including the Fox Theater (designated 8/24/94) and Kern County Chamber of Commerce Building (designated 3/12/08). With only 16 sites on its local register (compared to more than 300 sites designated by the City of Fresno), Bakersfield has been criticized for its lack of focus on historic preservation.

Geography 

Bakersfield lies near the southern "horseshoe" end of the San Joaquin Valley, with the southern tip of the Sierra Nevada just to the east. The city limits extend to the Sequoia National Forest, at the foot of the Greenhorn Mountain Range and at the entrance to the Kern Canyon. To the south, the Tehachapi Mountains, rising more than a vertical mile, feature the historic Tejon Ranch. To the west is the Temblor Range, behind which is the Carrizo Plain National Monument and the San Andreas Fault.

Hart Memorial Park is located in northeast Bakersfield along Alfred Harrell Highway.

Communities and neighborhoods 

Bakersfield has historically referred to its regions by directional names. They include: North Bakersfield, Northeast, Southeast, South Bakersfield, Southwest, and Northwest. East Bakersfield generally refers to the former town of Sumner (later renamed East Bakersfield). As a result, the Northeast wraps around East Bakersfield.

Climate 

Bakersfield has a hot arid climate (Köppen BWh), with very hot, dry summers, and winters that consist of mild days with chilly/cold nights. Rainfall is low in the city, averaging only  annually, with most of it falling in the winter. Bakersfield averages about 191 clear days a year. Bakersfield's climate makes the region suitable for growing crops ranging from carrots to citrus and almonds.

Bakersfield summers are very hot with extended stretches of hot weather and 112 days per year with high temperatures of + (on average between April 18 and October 13); in addition, there are 36 days with highs of + (on average between June 2 and September 19), and 0.9 days with highs of +. Some years can see wide fluctuations in temperatures throughout seasons, with triple digit temperature readings in May (rarely April) and October in addition to occasional highs below  in June not being uncommon. Except for occasional monsoons which may bring light rain, typically no rain or almost no rain will fall from May to September. Winters feature mild daytime temperatures and chilly/cold nights. Frost and/or dense fog usually occurs in winter with accompanying low visibility, causing many schools to have fog delays. Winters will usually produce a very dense layer of fog from time to time. Due to years of prolonged drought and rapid development of many new neighborhoods around Bakersfield, the density of the fog and number of "fog days" has been steadily decreasing, while areas outside the city still experience thick fog. The official time frame for tule fog to form is about 5 months long – various days from November 1 to March 31. Most noticeable in summer and winter, the urban heat island phenomenon can be observed throughout various neighborhoods in Bakersfield. On average, 10 mornings have freezing lows (on average between December 14 and January 24) annually, and the coldest night of the year typically bottoms out below .

Snow is rare on the valley floor although frost may occur.

Air quality 

Air quality is generally at its worst in fall and winter, due to the California wildfire season and colder temperatures forming an inversion layer, respectively. It is common for an inversion layer to form in the valley in the winter, in which temperatures can be warmer in the foothills above the valley with the valley itself being cooler. This can trap air pollution in Bakersfield and the surrounding valley areas for days, or even weeks at a time. This can typically be mediated by rain or strong winds. Emissions from agriculture, industry, rail freight and road traffic together create significant concentrations of air pollution. The extraction of oil and gas, a historic industry in the area, contributes to the poor air quality. Returning flowing water to the Kern River and along with trees is promoted as a way to improve air quality and enhance recreation in the city.

In 2015, Bakersfield had 28 days of "Unhealthy" and 1 day of "Very Unhealthy" air quality according to the EPA. This ranked 6th in the United States.

In 2016, Bakersfield had 14 days with "Unhealthy" air quality according to the EPA. This ranked 9th in the United States.

In 2017, Bakersfield had 23 days with "Unhealthy" air quality according to the EPA. Fourteen of those days were caused by the Thomas Fire located in adjacent Ventura and Santa Barbara counties. During that fire, Ventura and Santa Barbara counties experienced "Very Unhealthy" and "Hazardous" air quality.

In 2018, Bakersfield had 27 days with "Unhealthy" air quality according to the EPA. Most of these days were due to the second deadliest and most destructive wildfire season on record in California, behind the 2020 fire season. This ranked 6th in the United States.

In 2019, Bakersfield had only 6 days with "Unhealthy" air quality and 2 days with "Very Unhealthy" according to the EPA.

In 2020, Bakersfield had 31 days with "Unhealthy" air quality and 2 days with "Very Unhealthy" according to the EPA. This was largely caused by the record-breaking 2020 fire season.

In 2021, Bakersfield has recorded 28 days with "Unhealthy" air quality and 1 day with "Very Unhealthy" according to the EPA.

Demographics

2010 
The 2010 United States Census reported that Bakersfield had a population of 347,483. The ethnic makeup of Bakersfield was 197,389 (56.8%) White, 28,238 (8.1%) African American, 5,102 (1.5%) Native American, 21,432 (6.2%) Asian (2.1% Indian, 2.0% Filipino, 0.5% Chinese, 0.4% Korean, 0.2% Japanese, 478 (0.1%) Pacific Islander), 77,686 (22.4%) from other races, and 17,068 (4.9%) from two or more races. Hispanics or Latinos of any race were 158,205 persons (45.5%). Among the general population, 39.5% are Mexican, 1.3% Salvadoran, 0.5% Guatemalan, and 0.10% Colombian. Non-Hispanic Whites were 37.8% of the population in 2010, compared to 71% in 1980.

The census reported 344,088 people (99.0% of the population) lived in households, 2,094 (0.6%) lived in noninstitutionalized group quarters, and 1,301 (0.4%) were institutionalized.

Of the 111,132 households, 51,995 (46.8%) had children under the age of 18 living in them, 57,276 (51.5%) were opposite-sex married couples living together, 18,049 (16.2%) had a female householder with no husband present, and 7,829 (7.0%) had a male householder with no wife present.  There were 8,159 (7.3%) unmarried opposite-sex partnerships, and 845 (0.8%) same-sex married couples or partnerships. About 21,800 households (19.6%) were made up of individuals, and 7,354 (6.6%) had someone living alone who was 65 years of age or older. The average household size was 3.10.  There were 83,154 families (74.8% of all households); the average family size was 3.56.

The population was distributed as 109,479 people (31.5%) under the age of 18, 37,368 (10.8%) aged 18 to 24, 97,024 (27.9%) aged 25 to 44, 74,276  (21.4%) aged 45 to 64, and 29,336 (8.4%) who were 65 years of age or older.  The median age was 30.0 years. For every 100 females, there were 96.0 males.  For every 100 females age 18 and over, there were 92.5 males.

The 120,725 housing units averaged 840.6 per square mile (324.6/km2), of which 66,323 (59.7%) were owner-occupied, and 44,809 (40.3%) were occupied by renters. The homeowner vacancy rate was 3.2%; the rental vacancy rate was 9.0%.  About 206,492 people (59.4% of the population) lived in owner-occupied housing units, and 137,596 people (39.6%) lived in rental housing units.

Bakersfield has consistently ranked as one of the least educated metropolitan areas in the United States. A study by the Brookings Institution using 2008 data found that the proportion of Bakersfield metro adults age 25 and over with a bachelor's degree was the lowest (14.7%) of the 100 largest metropolitan areas in the United States; that 100th-place finish was down from being ranked 95th in 1990.

According to a Gallup-Healthways Well-Being Index, Bakersfield ranks as one of the ten most obese metro areas in America.  Of its residents, 33.6% were found to be obese, compared to the national average of 26.5%.  The same study found that 21.2% were smokers, 12.7% had diabetes, 27.9% had high blood pressure, 22.8% had high cholesterol, 3.3% have suffered a heart attack, 75.2% felt they had enough money to buy food and 75.5% had health insurance.

Housing and development 
Bakersfield saw its population grow from about 105,000 in 1980 to 347,000 in 2010. Although the city is still growing, its growth rate has slowed in recent years due to the economic recession and high home foreclosure rates. However, in October 2013, Bakersfield was found to be the number two city in the nation for the rental market. Apartment vacancies have become a large issue with only one percent of potential apartments being open to new renters as of April 2021. The average cost of rent and housing have dramatically increased in the last few years, with some apartments having their monthly rent nearly double in cost. Most new apartments being built are catering to commuting workers from Southern California and the Bay Area, with local residents being priced out.

The city of Shafter, a small farming town north of Bakersfield, previously filed a suit to attempt to limit the northern expansion of Bakersfield's city limits. Shafter has also annexed large pieces of farmland to its east and south to ensure that Bakersfield does not annex this area. Bakersfield, in addition, filed a lawsuit against Shafter in 2007 regarding water rights Shafter planned to use but Bakersfield stated it had purchased in 1976. As a result, the city of Bakersfield threatened to annex the city of Shafter.

The large bluff and plateau which lie east of Bakersfield—toward the Rio Bravo and Kern Canyon area—have been under development for the last 60 years. Because the steep, north-facing edge of the bluff provides a view of the foothills, mountains, oil fields, and Kern River, the city government has attempted to balance development and preservation in this area.

Economy 
Bakersfield's historic and primary industries have related to Kern County's two main industries, oil and agriculture. Kern County in 2013 was the most oil productive county in the US. Kern County is a part of the highly productive San Joaquin Valley, and ranks in the top five most productive agricultural counties in the nation. Major crops for Kern County include: grapes, citrus, almonds, carrots, alfalfa, cotton, and roses. The city serves as the home for both corporate and regional headquarters of companies engaged in these industries.

Bakersfield has a growing manufacturing and distribution sector. Several companies have moved to Bakersfield because of its inexpensive land, as well as proximity to international ports in both Los Angeles and Oakland. Other companies have opened regional offices and non-oil/agricultural businesses because of Bakersfield's and Kern County's business friendly policies, such as having no local utility or inventory taxes. Products manufactured in the city include: ice cream (world's largest ice cream plant), central vacuums, highway paint, and stock racing cars.

Sales tax in Bakersfield is 8.25%.

Top employers 
According to the Greater Bakersfield Chamber of Commerce, the top employers in the county based in Bakersfield are:

Arts and culture 

Many of Bakersfield's oldest and most historic restaurants are Basque, including Wool Growers, Noriega's, Pyrenees, Benji's, and Narducci's.

The Kern County Museum, located on Chester Avenue just north of downtown Bakersfield holds a collection of regional artifacts. Permanent exhibits include: "Black Gold: The Oil Experience", a hands-on modern approach at showing how oil is extracted; and "The Lori Brock Children's Discovery Museum", a hands-on children's museum and a display on the influential "Bakersfield Sound" style of country music. Bakersfield is also home to the Buena Vista Museum of Natural History, which has a collection of Miocene era marine fossils collected from the region as well as other displays.

The city gained fame in the late 1950s and early 1960s for the Bakersfield Sound, an electric guitar-driven subgenre of country music that commercially dominated the industry for more than a decade. Buck Owens, Dwight Yoakam, and Merle Haggard were its best-known stars.

Events 
Bakersfield hosts horse shows all year round, including local, 4-H and breed shows.

Every spring, Bakersfield hosts one of California's Scottish Games and Clan Gatherings. In the late summer, St. George's Greek Orthodox Church hosts an annual Greek Festival.

Every year during the summer, Bakersfield hosts the Lowrider National at the Kern County Fairgrounds.

Memorial Day weekend features the Kern County Basque Festival, sponsored by the Kern County Basque Club. This three-day festival features food, music, dance, and handball games.

In March, Famoso Raceway holds the annual March Meet nostalgia drag racing event. The event dates back to the U.S. Fuel and Gas Finals held in March 1959.

Twice a year, the CSUB Indigenous Native American Club hosts a Native Gathering on the California State University Bakersfield campus at Runner Park.

In mid to late September, Bakersfield holds the annual Kern County Fair, which showcases the area's agricultural produce and animal husbandry, along with a rodeo, concerts, and a traditional carnival.

Previously every year and now every five years, Bakersfield hosts a political conference known as the Bakersfield Business Conference. Since 1985, this conference has grown in attendance and as of 2007, the attendance numbered over 9,000. The Conference has had several notable political speakers to include Ronald Reagan, Jimmy Carter, Gerald Ford, George H. W. Bush, Margaret Thatcher, Neil Armstrong, Norman Schwarzkopf, Colin Powell, Mike Wallace, Dan Rather, Tom Brokaw, Rush Limbaugh, Sarah Palin and Paul Harvey.

Writers of Kern hosts their Spring Writers Conference in March or April each year. Edgar Award winner and internationally bestselling author, Anne Perry, was a notable speaker at one of these writer's conferences.

Entertainment 

Bakersfield has five movie multi-screen theaters: Edwards Bakersfield Stadium 14, Reading Cinemas Valley Plaza 16, Maya Cinemas Bakersfield 16, AMC Bakersfield 6, and a Studio Movie Grill. The historic downtown Fox Theater has been renovated and is now a venue for concerts, musicians, comedians, and movies. The Bakersfield Community Theatre is the oldest "live" community theater in California. There are others, including "The Empty Space" (which offers some free performances).

Music 
Due to the Dust Bowl, Buck Owens and his family migrated west where they would travel from Phoenix to the San Joaquin Valley to pick crops, including cotton. At 16, Owens moved to Bakersfield in 1951 where he and other musicians began to create what is now known as the Bakersfield sound. In 1996, Buck Owens opened the Crystal Palace, a music hall, nightclub, bar, restaurant, and museum, in Bakersfield.

Musician Merle Haggard was born and raised in Oildale. In 1962, Haggard completed his first single, "Skid Row", on Bakersfield's Tally label. In 1965, he went on to sign with Capitol Records. Most of Haggard's early songs reflect his time spent in prison, farming, and working blue collar jobs in Southern California, including Bakersfield.

Bakersfield is often considered to be the birthplace of a unique strand of country music that has inspired many country artists, such as Dwight Yoakam and The Strangers. Yoakam, alongside Owens, paid tribute to Owens by covering his 1973 recording of "Streets of Bakersfield". The cover reached number one on the Billboard Hot Country Singles chart in 1988.

Classical 
The Bakersfield Symphony Orchestra has been performing since 1932.

Country 
Bakersfield is known for the Bakersfield sound, "a twangy style of Fender Telecaster and pedal steel guitar music made popular by hometown country crooners Buck Owens and Merle Haggard" as well as The Strangers.

Doo-wop 
Bakersfield is also known for Doo-wop music dating back from the early-to-mid 1950s to the early-to-late 1960s, consisting of Doo-wop vocal groups such as The Paradons, The Colts, The Rev-Lons, and more.

Rock 
In 1972, Bob Weir released the song "Mexicali Blues" on his first solo album, Ace. Not only does the sound of the song pay tribute to the Bakersfield sound, but the name of the city is referenced in the lyrics.

In 1978, The Rolling Stones released the song "Far Away Eyes" on the album Some Girls. Mick Jagger and Keith Richards collaborated on writing the song and it was recorded in late 1977. The Rolling Stones, longtime country music fans, incorporated many aspects of "Bakersfield sound" country music into this song. Bakersfield is mentioned in the song.

Heavy Metal 
In the early 1990s, a group of friends from the lower and middle-class parts of Northeast and East Bakersfield formed the nu metal band Korn. The members of the band attended Highland High School (Jonathan Davis and Reginald "Fieldy" Arvizu), East High School (James "Munky" Shaffer and lead guitarist Brian "Head" Welch) and South High School (David Silveria). Korn has sold over 34 million albums worldwide and were given the keys to the city. Bakersfield is also the home of fellow metal groups Cradle of Thorns (formed in 1988 by Ty Elam as Videodrone) and Adema (The band formed in 2000 with members vocalist Mark Chavez, guitarist Tim Fluckey, guitarist Mike Ransom, bassist Dave DeRoo, and drummer Kris Kohls). On February 24, 2006, Bakersfield mayor Harvey Hall declared February 24 "Korn Day". On the same day, the back road to the Rabobank Arena was named Korn Row.

Bakersfield is also the home of Deathrock group Burning Image, one of the original bands of the early 80's Californian Deathrock scene.

Sports 

Bakersfield is not represented in any of the five major sports leagues: NFL, MLB, NBA, NHL, or MLS. The closest major sports teams are in Los Angeles and they have many fans in Bakersfield. The city is home to two minor league professional sports teams: the Bakersfield Condors (American Hockey League) and the Bakersfield Train Robbers baseball club (Pecos League). It was previously home to the California League's Bakersfield Blaze baseball team which ceased operations after the 2016 season. A third minor league team, the Bakersfield Jam of the D-League (basketball), was relocated to Prescott Valley, Arizona, in 2016. The Bakersfield Magic are an expansion team in The Basketball League that will begin play in 2022.

In addition, Bakersfield has two colleges with strong athletics programs. The Bakersfield Renegades represent Bakersfield College, a community college with 19 varsity sports, the most notable being football. It competes in the Western State Conference, which is a part of the California Community College Athletic Association. The Cal State Bakersfield Roadrunners represent California State University, Bakersfield and sponsor 15 varsity sports, the most notable being basketball. It competes in NCAA Division I as a member of the Big West Conference

Bakersfield is home to Colby Lewis from the MLB team, the Texas Rangers, Stephen Neal from the Super Bowl Champions, New England Patriots. NFL players Joey Porter, David and Derek Carr also have called Bakersfield home, and still have some connection to Bakersfield.

Bakersfield is also located near a variety of motor racing venues. Current racing sports include: drag strip (at Famoso Raceway), dirt (at Bakersfield Speedway), road course (at Buttonwillow Raceway), and a paved 1/2 mile oval (at Kern County Raceway Park), which replaced Mesa Marin Raceway, a NASCAR associated oval track, that was demolished in 2004. A 1/3 mile dirt track has also opened on the Kern County Raceway Park property.  The national jet boat association holds drag boat races at Lake Ming. Bakersfield is also the home town of four time Indianapolis 500 winner Rick Mears, as well as the 2007 Daytona 500 winner, and 2014 NASCAR Sprint Cup champion Kevin Harvick.

Bakersfield has many venues for a variety of different sports. One of the most notable and versatile is the Mechanics Bank Arena (formerly the Centennial Garden) which hosts concerts, shows, and sporting events. In addition, Bakersfield has facilities that can host tournament games. The Kern County Soccer Field has 24 full-size light soccer fields. Also, currently under construction is the Bakersfield Sports Village. When completed, it will have 16 baseball fields, 6 football fields, and 16 soccer fields.

Government and politics

Local government 
Bakersfield uses the Council-Manager form of government, in which the City Council is the primary governing authority.  The City Council consists of seven members, elected from seven wards (or districts). The Mayor is elected at large, and is the presiding member of the City Council, although she does not cast a vote except in a few instances. The City Council appoints and confirms (which the mayor does cast a vote) both the City Attorney and the City Manager. The City Manager, in turn, appoints (does not require confirmation from the City Council) the Finance Director, City Clerk, and Deputy City Clerk. In addition to these positions, Bakersfield also has several departments, used to provide the services necessary to the city. They are: Department of Development Services, Department of Economic and Community Development, Fire Department, Police Department, Department of Public Works, Department of Recreation and Parks, and Department of Water Resources.

The framework for the city government is defined in the City Charter. As of 2011, it contained 11 articles and 4 addendums. The current version was adopted on January 23, 1915. Little information is known about the City Charter adopted in 1873, or in 1898, when the city was incorporated. The City Charter has been amended several times since it was adopted. One of the more definitive amendments was to change the Mayor from an appointed position (by the City Council) to an elected position in 1956, which was done as a result of the 1952 Kern County earthquake.

The City Manager of Bakersfield is the appointed head of the executive branch. The position was created after 1957, when the role of mayor (which was the previous head) was split into two new positions. Under the council-manager form of government, the City Manager is responsible for executing ordinances passed by the city council and running the departments that make up the city. His office is currently located in City Hall North.

The city manager is appointed by the city council. His service can end in one of two ways. Either he: resigns, or by a vote of removal by the city council. The vote to appoint and remove is one of the few votes the mayor can cast.

For a list of past and present mayors, see List of mayors of Bakersfield.

State and federal 

Federally, Bakersfield is split between California's 20th congressional district, which is represented by House Speaker Kevin McCarthy and California's 22nd congressional district, which is represented by Republican David Valadao.

Political makeup 
An August 2005 article in the Seattle Post-Intelligencer listed Bakersfield as the eighth-most-conservative city in the United States and the most conservative city in California. In the 2008 Presidential election, Republican John McCain received 55.6% of the city's votes to Democrat Barack Obama's 42.9%.  The same year, Bakersfield cast 75.2% of its votes in favor of Proposition 8, which amended the California Constitution to ban same-sex marriage. In the 2016 presidential election, Donald Trump received 50.4% of the vote compared to Hillary Clinton's 44.0%. Large influxes of people moving to Bakersfield from Southern California and the Bay Area have been changing the political makeup of Bakersfield, while Kern County as a whole still remains strongly Republican.

Public safety 
Law enforcement within the city limits is provided by the Bakersfield Police Department. Fire protection within the city is provided jointly by the Bakersfield Fire Department and by the Kern County Fire Department, which protects the county as a whole.

Bakersfield is traditionally acknowledged as the frontier delineating Sureño and Norteño gang territories.

Police 

The Bakersfield Police Department (BPD) is the agency responsible for law enforcement. It has over 363 officers and 100 professional staff, covering an area of  serving an urban population of more than 800,000. The current chief of the department is Greg Terry. The department protects the city, split between two areas: West area and East area, with police headquarters in the east and the west substation serving west Bakersfield. The department administration is made up of the chief of police, one assistant chief, four captains and eleven lieutenants.

The department headquarters are located at 1601 Truxtun Avenue. The West Substation is located at 1301 Buena Vista Road. Satellite offices are located on E. 11th Street and on E. White Lane. The department pistol range is located on Truxtun Avenue, with the K-9 training grounds next door to the range. The department training academy is located on Norris Road in conjunction with the Kern County Sheriff's Department.

The 2015 Mapping Police Violence study calculated that Bakersfield police killed civilians at the highest rate in the U.S., logging 13.6 killings per million people, compared to the U.S. average of 3.6. In all, 13 people were killed in 2015 by BPD Officers and 27 people were killed by law enforcement officers in Kern County, which has a population of approximately 900,000. The Guardian reported that law enforcement officers in Kern County, California, killed more people per capita than in any other American county in 2015.

Fire 
The Bakersfield Fire Department has 14 stations spread across the city.

The Bakersfield Fire Department's communications division, known as ECC (Emergency Communications Center), is located in the Whiting Communications Center in Northeast Bakersfield. ECC is a joint dispatch center for the Kern County, Bakersfield City, and California City Fire Departments. Built in 1988, ECC is responsible for dispatching resources over an area of approximately  that includes 65 fire stations. ECC's approximate call volume is 82,000 calls a year and processes Emergency and Non-Emergency Fire and Medical 911 calls for the entire County of Kern.

The Kern County Fire Department (KCFD) is the agency that provides fire protection and emergency medical services for the county of Kern, California, USA. KCFD provides fire protection services for over 500,000 citizens living in the unincorporated areas of Kern County and the cities of Arvin, Delano, Maricopa, McFarland, Ridgecrest, Shafter, Taft, Tehachapi and Wasco. This agency is contracted to provide dispatch services for the California City Fire Department, Kern Ambulance based in Wasco, and Care Ambulance based in Lake Isabella. Over 546 uniformed firefighters are stationed in 46 fire stations throughout the county.

Due to a vast number of county islands and jagged city limit lines in the south part of Bakersfield, the closest fire station is dispatched to incidents. This often results in city resources being dispatched to county locations, and vice versa.

Crime 

The number of violent crimes recorded by the Bakersfield Police Department in its 2008 Crime Reports was 5,961. 27 of those were murders and homicides. Data collected by Bakersfield Police Department, an anti-gang program under the city of Bakersfield, shows that the city of Bakersfield has experienced an increase in gang membership and gang activity since the early 2000s.

Jails 
The Bakersfield Police Department has a holding area, but inmates are transported to the Kern County Central Receiving Facility in Bakersfield. Sentenced criminals are held at the Lerdo Detention Facility, just outside the city's limits. The Kern County Sheriff's Office, Detentions Bureau has an average daily inmate population of approximately 2,500 inmates.

The primary facility for receiving inmates arrested in the Bakersfield area is the Central Receiving Facility.  In addition, there is the Lerdo Complex, which consists of three facilities:
 The Lerdo Minimum Security Facility holds inmates of lower security levels.
The Lerdo Pre-Trial Facility holds inmates of higher security levels.
The Lerdo Max/Med Security Facility holds overflow inmates from the Pre-Trial Facility.

Education 

Two of the earliest schools founded in Kern County were Mrs. Thomas Baker's school, opened in 1863 at the Baker home (near present-day 19th and N streets); and a Catholic parochial school opened by Reverend Father Daniel Dade in 1865 in Havilah (then the county seat). In 1880, Norris School was established. The land for this school was donated by William Norris, a local farmer. Thirteen to twenty students were taught in its one classroom during the 1880s. Bakersfield City School District (BCSD) is the state's largest elementary school district. The first high school in Bakersfield, Kern County Union High School, opened in 1893. It was renamed Bakersfield High School after World War II.

The site at California Avenue and F Street is the location of the first campus of Bakersfield College, which was established in 1913 and relocated in 1956 to its current location overlooking the Panorama Bluffs in northeast Bakersfield. Bakersfield College has an enrollment of 16,000 students. To serve a growing baby-boomer population after World War II, the Kern High School District has steadily expanded to nineteen campuses and more than 35,000 students, making it the largest high school district in the state. In 1965, a university in the California State University system was founded in Bakersfield. California State University, Bakersfield (CSUB) has approximately 10,000 students. It was an NCAA Division II sports powerhouse in the California Collegiate Athletic Association (CCAA) with some sports, including wrestling (Pac-10), competing in Division I. CSUB has become a Division I athletic school and will join the Big West Conference in 2020. In 1982, the Bakersfield campus for Santa Barbara Business College was founded.

High schools 

Bakersfield is part of the Kern High School District (KHSD), California's largest high school district, comprising 28 schools and educating about 35,000 students. There are 17 high schools within the KHSD in Bakersfield:

Arvin High School
Bakersfield High School
Centennial High School
East Bakersfield High School
Foothill High School
Frontier High School
Golden Valley High School
Highland High School
Independence High School
Liberty High School
Mira Monte High School
North High School
Ridgeview High School
Shafter High School
South High School
Stockdale High School
West High School

Private high schools include Garces Memorial High School, Bakersfield Christian High School, and Bakersfield Adventist Academy.

Accredited colleges and universities

California State University, Bakersfield 

California State University, Bakersfield ("CSUB", "CSU Bakersfield", or "Cal State Bakersfield") is a public university founded in Bakersfield in 1965. The university offers 31 bachelor's and 22 master's degree programs. As of fall 2017, over 10,000 undergraduate and graduate students attended CSUB, at either the main campus in Bakersfield or the satellite campus, Antelope Valley Center in Lancaster, California.

Bakersfield College 

Bakersfield College ("BC") is a public community college located in Bakersfield, California. BC serves more than 18,000 students each semester and is part of the Kern Community College District. Currently, there are a total of 184 Associate's degree and certificate programs for students to choose from. BC is a part of the California Community Colleges system.

Other colleges and universities 
National University and University of Phoenix maintains a campus in Bakersfield, while the University of LaVerne, Fresno Pacific University, and Point Loma Nazarene University all have branch campuses located in Bakersfield. San Joaquin Valley College and Santa Barbara Business College also have campuses in Bakersfield.

Media 

Bakersfield is served by several media outlets. The primary newspaper is The Bakersfield Californian, which is a direct descendant of the first paper published in the region, The Daily Courier in 1866.

The city has a number of television stations and network affiliates, including KERO-TV (ABC), KBAK-TV (CBS), KGET-TV (NBC), KBFX-CD (Fox), KABE-CD (Univision), KKEY-LP (Telemundo), KNXT-LD (MyNetworkTV), KGET-DT2 (CW+) and is served by Fresno's PBS affiliate, KVPT. Bakersfield is also home to Spanish-language broadcaster Univision's only English-language station, KUVI-DT.

Transportation

Highways 

Bakersfield is serviced by an extensive highway network which includes three freeways. State Route 99 bisects Bakersfield from north to south, while State Route 58 exists as a freeway east of SR 99, servicing the southeast part of the city and extending over the Tehachapi mountains to Tehachapi, Mojave, and Barstow. State Route 178 consists of a short segment of freeway that runs from a point near downtown to the northeastern part of the city, although there is currently no direct freeway connection between SR 99 and SR 178. Interstate 5 bypasses the city several miles to the west.

Bakersfield is also served by a short, unsigned, four-lane freeway called Alfred Harrell Highway. It was constructed between 1956 and 1958 and extends from China Grade Loop to Hart Park (a large recreation park in northeast Bakersfield). There is also a two-lane expressway to the east of the park. This section was originally reserved to be converted to a four-lane freeway similar to the constructed western portion. If it were ever constructed, it would have two interchanges (at Morning Drive and Lake Ming Road) and would terminate at the SR 178 adopted alignment (not constructed).

Both SR 58 and SR 178 have planned future extensions. The western extension of SR 58 is known as the Centennial Corridor, which will extend the freeway west to I-5. Included in the Centennial Corridor is the Westside Parkway (sometimes referred to by its formal name, the Kern River Freeway). This is a newer freeway which runs through western Bakersfield, on a route parallel to the Kern River and Stockdale Highway. The western extension of SR 178 is known as the Crosstown Freeway/SR 178 Connection, although it was formerly known as the Centennial Corridor before that name was moved to SR 58. It is planned to connect SR 178 to the Westside Parkway.

In addition to these freeway extensions, there is also a proposed network of beltways. Currently, there are two beltways being considered in Bakersfield. The West Beltway would run north–south from Seventh Standard Road to Taft Highway. It will run parallel to Heath Road to the north and parallel to South Allen Road to the south. A future extension would connect the West Beltway to SR 99 and I-5, providing a bypass to Bakersfield. The South Beltway would run east–west from SR 58 to I-5. From SR 58, it would run south, parallel to Comanche Drive until Taft Highway. From there, the freeway would turn west, and run parallel to Taft Highway until terminating at I-5.

A future extension would extend the freeway north to SR 178 and terminate at Alfred Harrell Highway. Bakersfield also envisioned Caltrans building a North Beltway as the western extension of SR 58, but this has been withdrawn in favor of the Centennial Corridor.

Most of Bakersfield's major streets are six-lane divided roads with bike lanes, with almost every street in the city having proper lane signage for bicycle traffic. Bicycles are a popular mode of transportation in Bakersfield, due to the city's relatively flat topography and grid-like street system. Newer neighborhoods on the outskirts of the city, previously surrounded by two-lane farm roads, are prompting more large, divided roads to be built to help ease the increase in traffic that has resulted from the increase in population. Many developers choose to widen the roads that connect these neighborhoods at their own discretion, which can cause a major road to widen and narrow repeatedly over a short distance (Allen Road and Panama Lane are prime examples of this). Since the Bakersfield city limit boundaries are not uniform, this can cause Kern County "islands" to exist within Bakersfield. The county of Kern may choose not to upgrade a road while the city of Bakersfield does improve a road, which can cause traffic congestion to increase (Calloway Drive from the Westside Parkway north to Rosedale Highway best exemplifies this disparity).

Bakersfield is currently one of the largest cities in the U.S. that is not directly linked to an Interstate highway. However, SR 99 and SR 58 have been considered for conversion to Interstates. SR 99 would be a new Interstate signed either as Interstate 7 or Interstate 9, while SR 58 would be an extension of I-40 which currently terminates in Barstow. In 2005, SR 99 was added to the FHWA list of high priority corridors as "California farm to market route" and designated a Future Interstate.

Garces Memorial Traffic Circle, informally known as Garces Circle or just "the Circle", is a traffic circle in Bakersfield. The traffic circle is located at the intersection of Chester Avenue, Golden State Avenue (State Route 204), and 30th Street. The Circle was built circa 1932 as a part of US 99. A large sculpture of  Francisco Garces was erected inside the circle in 1939.

Bus 

Bakersfield is served by Golden Empire Transit. Eighteen routes are operated, the majority of which serve the urbanized portion of the county which includes the city of Bakersfield. Bakersfield is also served by Kern Transit, which connects Bakersfield with other communities in Kern County. Intercity bus providers in Bakersfield include Amtrak Thruway, Greyhound, Flixbus, Orange Belt Stages, National Charter Bus, Intercalifornias, TUFESA, and Fronteras del Norte.

The privately owned Airport Valet Express used to offer daily service between Bakersfield and LAX via a connection at the Van Nuys FlyAway bus station, however, they suspended service during the 2020 pandemic and have not yet announced a reopening date.

Rail 

For freight, Bakersfield is served directly by two class-1 railroads, Union Pacific, and BNSF. North of the city, each railroad uses its own rail lines; south of the city, they share a line owned by Union Pacific. The route travels over Tehachapi Pass (and through the Tehachapi Loop). There are several spur lines in and around Bakersfield. The majority are operated by the San Joaquin Valley Railroad, owned by Genesee & Wyoming.

Passenger service is provided by the San Joaquin Route, operated by Amtrak California. The Bakersfield Amtrak Station is located downtown, at the intersection of S Street and Truxtun Avenue. The city is the southern terminus of the route; passenger trains are normally not allowed to travel through the Tehachapi Loop to Los Angeles. There are five Amtrak Thruway Motorcoach routes, which connect passengers to destinations west, south, and east. Kern Transit also uses the station as one of its hubs, connecting passengers to regions throughout Kern County. A station for Bakersfield is planned as part of the California High-Speed Rail system, now under construction.

Airport 
Meadows Field Airport in Bakersfield was recently rebuilt and dedicated as the William M. Thomas Terminal.

Also located at the Airport are the Hall Medivac Helicopter, International Flight Training Academy (a subsidiary of Japan's ANA Airlines), SRT Helicopter Flight School, and numerous other aviation mechanics and technicians. However, IFTA has suspended operations in March 2014.

Sites of interest 
The following is a list of sites of interest in and around Bakersfield:
Bakersfield Sign (Central)
Beale Memorial Clock Tower (Central)
Buck Owens Crystal Palace (Central)
Fox Theater (Downtown)
Kern County Museum (Central)
Kern Veterans Memorial (Downtown)
Padre Hotel (Downtown)
Mill Creek (Downtown)
The Park at River Walk (Southwest)

Notable people

Sister cities 

Bucheon, Gyeonggi-do, South Korea 
Minsk, Belarus (Inactive since June 1999)
Wakayama, Japan (July 14, 1961)
Cixi, Zhejiang, China 
Santiago de Querétaro, Querétaro, Mexico
Amritsar, Punjab, India

See also 
List of U.S. cities with large Hispanic populations

Notes

References

External links 

Bakersfield Convention & Visitors Bureau

 

 
Cities in Kern County, California
San Joaquin Valley
Incorporated cities and towns in California
County seats in California
Basque-American culture in California
1873 establishments in California
Populated places established in 1860